Henry Sims (born 1990) is an American basketball player. Henry Sims or Simms may also refer to:

Henry "Son" Sims (1890–1958), American Delta blues fiddler and songwriter
Henry Augustus Sims (1832–1875), Philadelphia architect
Henry Simms (–1747), English thief and highwayman
Henry Simms (organist) (1804–1872), English organist and composer